was a railway station in Nanae, Kameda District,  Hokkaidō, Japan. The station closed on March 12, 2022.

Lines
Hokkaido Railway Company
Hakodate Main Line (Sawara branch line) Station N69

Adjacent stations

Railway stations in Hokkaido Prefecture
Railway stations in Japan opened in 1945
Railway stations closed in 2022